The following is a list of events, births, and deaths in 1857 in Switzerland.

Incumbents 
Federal Council:
Jakob Stämpfli 
Jonas Furrer 
Josef Munzinger 
Constant Fornerod (President)
Friedrich Frey-Herosé 
Wilhelm Matthias Naeff 
Stefano Franscini then Giovanni Battista Pioda

Events 

 Hansli Kopp discovers La Tène culture artifacts
 Hugo Schiff leaves Germany for Switzerland due to political turmoil
 A conference between France, the United Kingdom, Prussia, and Russia ends the Neuchâtel Crisis as Prussia yields its claim to the principality
 The first Federal Palace completes construction

Arts and literature 
 Horizons prochains by Madame de Gasparins is published

Births 
 March 14 - Rudolf Thurneysen, linguist and Celticist (d. 1940)
 June 18 - Arthur Hoffmann, politician (d. 1927)
 July 12 - Amé Pictet, chemist (d. 1937)
 July 31 - Ernest Chuard, politician (d. 1942)
 August 13 - Henri François Pittier, geographer and botanist (d. 1950)
 November 26 - Ferdinand de Saussure, linguist (d. 1913)
 César Roux, surgeon (d. 1934)

Deaths 
 July 19 - Stefano Franscini, member of the Swiss Federal Council (b. 1796)

References 

 
Years of the 19th century in Switzerland